Zhou Chu (236?–297), courtesy name Ziyin, was a Western Jin-era Chinese general. He was the son of Zhou Fang, a famous Eastern Wu general.

Zhou Chu had a reputation for uprightness and integrity and once indicted the Prince of Liang, Sima Rong. When the Di tribe invaded from the northwest, Zhou Chu was ordered by Sima Rong to fight the 20,000-strong enemy head-on with 5,000 soldiers and no supply. He died in the battles. Zhou Chu is depicted in the Wu Shuang Pu (無雙譜, Table of Peerless Heroes) by Jin Guliang.

Eradicating the Three Scourges
A folk story about Zhou Chu appeared in the 430 book A New Account of the Tales of the World and proved to be very popular. The story claims that Zhou Chu was such a cruel and violent ruffian in his younger days that he was called one of the "Three Scourges" by the villagers in his native  (present-day city of Yixing, Jiangsu), along with a tiger and a dragon.

Prompted by a villager, Zhou Chu took on the challenge to seek out and kill the tiger and the scaly dragon that lived in a stream (the jiao). His battle with this dragon endured for 3 days in Lake Tai, and the villagers were celebrating the demise of the two scourges when Zhou Chu returned triumphant with the dragon's head. That was when he realized that he was the last scourge that the villagers feared. Determined to mend his old ways, he sought out Eastern Wu generals Lu Ji and Lu Yun, and received encouragement. Eventually he became an accomplished general beloved by his people.

Death
Zhou Chu became Palace Aide to the Censor-in-Chief and had no fear in indicting and exposing the wrongdoings of other ministers. He thus offended many, including Sima Rong, son of Sima Yi and an uncle of Emperor Wu of Jin. In 296, when Sima Rong was named the Grand General of the Western expedition to quell Qi Wannian's rebellion, Zhou Chu was named the vanguard general. His fellow general Sun Xiu warned him and suggested him to bid his aging mother a final farewell. Zhou Chu replied, "One cannot fulfill both filial piety and loyalty at the same time. Since I have already chosen to serve my country... I will die for it."

Zhou Chu was ordered to take 5,000 soldiers to attack the 20,000-strong enemy. After the attacks began, Sima Rong also ordered his supply to be cut off completely. Zhou's troops ran out of arrows and the generals assigned to reinforce him did not help. When asked to flee, Zhou Chu replied, "I am a minister of a nation. Isn't it proper to die for one's country?" He fought to his death.

Explanatory notes

References

Jin dynasty (266–420) generals
236 births
297 deaths
People from Yixing
Jin dynasty (266–420) politicians
Politicians from Wuxi
People of Eastern Wu
Deified Chinese people
Legendary Chinese people
Jin dynasty (266–420) people killed in action